Prelude is the eighth studio album by Brazilian keyboardist Eumir Deodato, released in 1973. With the signature track "Also Sprach Zarathustra (2001)" (an arrangement of the theme from 2001: A Space Odyssey), Prelude would become the most successful recording for Deodato and CTI Records.

The album features guitarist John Tropea on three tracks, bassists Ron Carter and Stanley Clarke, and Billy Cobham on drums. The funk-influenced version of the "Introduction" from Richard Strauss's Also sprach Zarathustra, entitled "Also Sprach Zarathustra (2001)", won the 1974 Grammy Award for Best Pop Instrumental Performance and went to number two in the pop charts in the US, number three in Canada, and number seven in the UK. In 1977, the album was re-released briefly as 2001 with an alternate cover photo.

Later releases
This album was reissued on the Super Audio CD format in October 2017 by UK label Dutton Vocalion,
Remastered in both Stereo and Surround Sound from the original analogue tapes by Michael J. Dutton and released as a 2-fer with 1973's "Deodato 2".
The Surround Sound portion of the disc features the Quadraphonic mixes of both "Prelude" and "Deodato 2" made available for the first time in over 40 years.

Track listing

Charts

Personnel
Eumir Deodato - piano, electric piano
Ron Carter - electric bass (solo on "Baubles, Bangles and Beads"), bass
Stanley Clarke - electric bass (solo on "Also Sprach Zarathustra (2001)")
Billy Cobham - drums
John Tropea - electric guitar (solo on "Also Sprach Zarathustra (2001)", "Baubles, Bangles and Beads", "September 13")
Jay Berliner - guitar (solo on "Spirit of Summer")
Airto Moreira - percussion
Ray Barretto - congas
Hubert Laws - flute (solo on "Prelude to Afternoon of a Faun")
John Frosk - trumpet
Marky Markowitz - trumpet
Joe Shepley - trumpet
Marvin Stamm - trumpet (Solo on "Prelude to Afternoon of a Faun")
Wayne Andre - trombone
Garnett Brown - trombone
Paul Faulise - trombone
George Strakey - trombone
Bill Watrous - trombone
Jim Buffington - french horn
Peter Gordon - french horn
Phil Bodner - flute
George Marge - flute
Romeo Penque - flute
Max Ellen - violin
Paul Gershman - violin
Emanuel Green - violin
Harry Lookofsky - violin
David Nadien - violin
Gene Orloff - violin
Eliot Rosoff - violin
Emanuel Vardi - viola
Al Brown - viola
Harvey Shapiro - cello
Seymore Barab - cello
Charles McKracken - cello

Production
Producer: Creed Taylor
Arranged and conducted by Eumir Deodato
Engineer: Rudy Van Gelder
Recorded at Van Gelder Studios

Sources
 Steve Futterman, Prelude sleeve text

References

1973 albums
Albums arranged by Eumir Deodato
Albums produced by Creed Taylor
Albums recorded at Van Gelder Studio
CTI Records albums
Eumir Deodato albums
Jazz-funk albums